Puhtu Biological Station is a research station located in Pärnu county Lääneranna Parish, Estonia, at the coast of Baltic Sea. It is one of the oldest biology stations in Estonia.

The station is in the Puhtu peninsula, at the territory of Puhtu-Laelatu Nature Reserve, some kilometers from Laelatu Biological Station. It is an important bird area. The main building was built in 1920s and belonged to the biologist Jakob von Uexküll. In 1949, after World War II, it became an official research station. It is known for ornithology research, especially bird ecophysiology and ecology. Puhtu biology station belonged to the Estonian Institute of Zoology and Botany, and since 1997 to the Estonian University of Life Sciences (since the institute joined the university).

Gallery

References

Sources
Toomas Kukk (ed.) 2010. Puhtu ajalugu ja loodus. Estonia Maritima 8.

Lääneranna Parish
Biological stations